Sheikh ul-Alam International Airport  also known as Srinagar International Airport and Budgam Airbase, is an international airport serving Srinagar, the summer capital of Jammu and Kashmir, India. It is owned by the Indian Air Force, and the Airports Authority of India operates a civil enclave at the airport. It was designated as an international airport in 2005. It has an integrated terminal and one asphalt runway.

History
Originally, the Srinagar Airport was used only by the Indian Air Force. During the Indo-Pakistani War of 1947, the airport received an airlift of Indian troops who prevented Pakistan from capturing the city of Srinagar. Although the airport was small and lacked landing aids, the airlift was still carried out successfully on 27 October. In September 1965, the Srinagar Airport was subjected to an air raid amid the Indo-Pakistani War of 1965, which left some aircraft damaged.

In 1979, the Airports Authority of India established a civil enclave at the airport. The terminal was modified in February 1998 to be able to handle international Hajj flights, which first started operating from Srinagar in January 2002. During the Kargil War in 1999, the airport was taken over completely by the Air Force, and civilian flights were prohibited from landing.

In March 2005, the airport was granted international status by the Indian government. In 2006, the airport was renamed Sheikh-ul-Alam International Airport after the Kashmiri patron saint. An expanded terminal, able to serve both domestic and international flights, was inaugurated on 14 February 2009 by politician Sonia Gandhi. It was part of a larger expansion project that also included an increase in the number of parking stands from four to nine. On the same day, Air India Express started once weekly flights to Dubai, the first regularly scheduled international flights from Srinagar. However, due to low demand from passengers, the flights were terminated in January 2010. In 2019, the authorities started planning to create a new airport terminal handling only international flights, which would leave the domestic ones in the older 2009 building.

Infrastructure
The Srinagar Airport has an integrated terminal, handling both domestic and international flights. The terminal is designed to look like the Himalayas and has a sloping roof that facilitates snow removal. Amenities include a food court, some small independent food outlets, a handicrafts shop, ATMs, currency exchange, chocolates shop, and WiFi. There are 4 aerobridges linked with the terminal.

There is a single asphalt runway, 13/31, with dimensions . It has been equipped to handle instrument landing system approaches since February 2011. Several food joints like KFC and Pizza Hut are also available in the airport since 2018.

In September 2021, Aviation Minister Jyotiraditya Scindia announced that the terminal will be expanded from the present 25,000 sq. m. to 63,000 sq. m., from an investment of ₹ 1,500 crore.

Night landing 
In December 2017, it was announced that the airport would handle night operations. Later in August 2018, a test flight was conducted by DGCA Team and it was passed.

On 19 March 2021, commercial night flying operations at the airport started as Go-First flight bound for Delhi took off at 19:15 hrs IST. Before 19 March 2021, the last flight that took off from the airport was at 17:45 hrs IST.

Airlines and destinations

Statistics

Notable accidents and incidents
On 7 September 1965, amid the Indo-Pakistani War of 1965, four fighter jets of the Pakistan Air Force attacked the Srinagar airport. An Indian Air Force Douglas C-47 Skytrain and an Indian Airlines Douglas DC-3 were destroyed during the air raid. A Chicago Tribune article published the following day reported that one Indian aircraft and a "Caribou transport of the United Nations observers headquarters" were damaged.

Access
There is a car park with 250 spaces. The airport is also served by taxis and car rental agencies, which have their booths outside the terminal.

See also
 Gulmarg
 Pahalgam
 Aharbal
 Dal Lake
 Mughal Road
 Kausar Nag
 Kashmir Valley

References

External links

 
 Srinagar International Airport at the Airports Authority of India

Buildings and structures in Srinagar
Airports in Jammu and Kashmir
International airports in India
Transport in Srinagar